Hosea 14 is the fourteenth chapter of the Book of Hosea in the Hebrew Bible or the Old Testament of the Christian Bible. This chapter contains the prophecies attributed to the prophet Hosea son of Beeri as an exhortation to repentance (Hosea 14:1-3) and a promise of God's blessing (Hosea 14:4-9). It is a part of the Book of the Twelve Minor Prophets.

Text 
The original text was written in Hebrew language. This chapter is divided into 9 verses in Christian Bibles, but 10 verses in the Hebrew Bible with the following verse numbering comparison:

This article generally follows the common numbering in Christian English Bible versions, with notes to the numbering in Hebrew Bible versions.

Textual witnesses
Some early manuscripts containing the text of this chapter in Hebrew are of the Masoretic Text tradition, which includes the Codex Cairensis (895), the Petersburg Codex of the Prophets (916), Aleppo Codex (10th century), Codex Leningradensis (1008). Fragments containing parts of this chapter in Hebrew were found among the Dead Sea Scrolls, including 4Q78 (4QXIIc; 75–50 BCE) with extant verses 1–5 (verse 1–6 in Masoretic text); and 4Q82 (4QXIIg; 25 BCE) with extant verses 8–9 (verses 9–10 in Masoretic text).

There is also a translation into Koine Greek known as the Septuagint, made in the last few centuries BCE. Extant ancient manuscripts of the Septuagint version include Codex Vaticanus (B; B; 4th century), Codex Alexandrinus (A; A; 5th century) and Codex Marchalianus (Q; Q; 6th century).

Verse 1
 Return, O Israel, to the Lord your God,
for you have stumbled because of your iniquity.
 "You have stumbled": from Hebrew ka-shalta, "fallen due to a false step".

Verse 9
 Who is wise, and he shall understand these things?
 prudent, and he shall know them?
 for the ways of the Lord are right,
 and the just shall walk in them:
 but the transgressors shall fall therein.
This epilogue sums up the whole previous teaching. Only here Hosea uses the term "righteous," a rare character in his day.
 "But the transgressors shall fall therein": the "transgressors of the law of God" according to Kimchi's father will "stumble in them and fall"; or as Jarchi and the Targum state, "they fall into hell, into ruin and destruction, because they walk not in them"; but the sense also seems as Christ himself, his ways and his word, his doctrines and his ordinances, be stumbling blocks to wicked men, at which they stumble, and fall, and perish; see ; .

See also

 Ashur, the grandson of Noah in Genesis
 Ephraim
 Israel
 Lebanon

Related Bible parts: , Psalm 111, Proverbs 1, Hosea 13

Notes

References

Sources

External links

Jewish
Hosea 14 Hebrew with Parallel English
Hosea 14 Hebrew with Rashi's Commentary

Christian
Hosea 14 English Translation with Parallel Latin Vulgate

14